Française des Jeux may refer to:

Française des Jeux (cycling team)
Française des Jeux (lottery)